Emma Rose Roberts (born February 10, 1991) is an American actress. Known for her work in film and television projects of the horror and thriller genres, she has received various accolades, including a Young Artist Award, an MTV Movie & TV Award, and a ShoWest Award.

After making her acting debut in the crime film Blow (2001), Roberts gained recognition for her lead role as Addie Singer on the Nickelodeon television teen sitcom Unfabulous (2004–2007). For the series, she released her debut soundtrack album, Unfabulous and More, in 2005. She went on to appear in numerous films, including Aquamarine (2006), Nancy Drew (2007), Wild Child (2008), Hotel for Dogs (2009), Valentine's Day (2010), It's Kind of a Funny Story (2010), and The Art of Getting By (2011).

Looking for more mature roles, Roberts obtained starring roles in the films Lymelife (2008), 4.3.2.1. (2010), Scream 4 (2011), Adult World (2013), We're the Millers (2013), Palo Alto (2013), The Blackcoat's Daughter (2015), Nerve (2016), Who We Are Now (2017), Paradise Hills (2019), and Holidate (2020). Roberts gained further recognition for her starring roles in multiple seasons of the FX anthology horror series American Horror Story (2013–present) and for the lead role of Chanel Oberlin on the Fox comedy horror series Scream Queens (2015–2016).

Early life
Roberts was born on February 10, 1991, in Rhinebeck, New York, to Kelly Cunningham and actor Eric Roberts. Her parents divorced when she was seven months old. Through her father's marriage, she is the stepdaughter of Eliza Roberts and step-granddaughter of David Rayfiel and Lila Garrett. Through her mother's marriage, she is the stepdaughter of musician Kelly Nickels. She has a younger maternal half-sister, Grace. Her paternal grandmother was acting coach Betty Lou Bredemus, and her aunts are actresses Julia Roberts and Lisa Roberts Gillan. During her childhood, Roberts spent time on the sets of her aunt Julia's films. These experiences sparked a desire to follow her father and aunts into the film industry. Her mother initially wanted her to have a normal childhood. She is of English, Scottish, Irish, Welsh, German, and Swedish descent through her father.

Career

2000s: Beginnings and child acting 
Roberts made her acting debut at age nine in Ted Demme's 2001 drama film Blow. It was the first film for which she auditioned. In the film, she portrayed Kristina Jung, the daughter of Johnny Depp's character (cocaine smuggler George Jung). That year, she also had a role in Leif Tilden's 10-minute short bigLove, and was an uncredited extra in some scenes featuring her aunt Julia Roberts in America's Sweethearts. Roberts went on to appear in smaller roles in two family films: in 2002's Grand Champion, as the sister of the main character Buddy (Jacob Fisher); and in 2006's Spymate, as the daughter of former secret agent Mike Muggins (Chris Potter), who tries to rescue her with the help of a spy monkey. Grand Champion had a brief theatrical release in August 2004, while Spymate was not released until February 2006, when it was given a theatrical run in Canada, followed by its DVD release in April 2006.  
In 2004, she began starring as the lead character Addie Singer in the Nickelodeon sitcom Unfabulous, which debuted in September of that year. The sitcom earned Roberts several Teen Choice Award and Young Artist Award nominations. The series focused on a seventh grader, Addie, and her two best friends. It aired for three seasons (2004–2007). The show also spawned TV movies, including The Perfect Moment. Also in 2004, Roberts guest starred in an episode of the Nickelodeon series Drake & Josh titled "Honor Council". After her run on Unfabulous, Nickelodeon had considered giving Roberts a kick start into a music career. In 2005, Roberts released a debut album titled Unfabulous and More. The album was released on September 27, 2005, through Columbia Records and Nick Records. It also served as the soundtrack to the television series Unfabulous, in which Roberts starred. The album peaked at number 46 and 10 on Billboard Heatseekers Albums and Kid Albums charts, respectively. In September 2005, two singles were released from the album: "I Wanna Be" and "Dummy". The album includes several original songs (among them "Dummy" and "I Wanna Be", both of which were also released as music videos, "I Have Arrived" and "This Is Me", which was co-written by Roberts), as well as some of Addie's songs from the first season, including "Punch Rocker" and "New Shoes" (both from the episode "The Party"), "94 Weeks (Metal Mouth Freak)" (from "The Bar Mitzvah") and "Mexican Wrestler" (which had previously appeared on Jill Sobule's 2000 album Pink Pearl and in the episode "The 66th Day" from Unfabulous).

In the same year, Roberts recorded "If I Had It My Way" for the soundtrack of the 2005 Disney film Ice Princess. In 2006, Roberts covered the song "Island in the Sun", which was originally recorded by Weezer in 2001; she recorded the song for the Aquamarine soundtrack, a film in which she starred as one of the lead actors. Also in 2006, Roberts returned to the big screen, starring alongside Sara Paxton and singer JoJo in Aquamarine. She won a 2007 Young Artist Award for Best Supporting Young Actress in a Feature Film for her role in the film. The film Aquamarine took fifth place at the box office in its opening weekend making $8 million. In early 2006, Roberts finished shooting her title role in Nancy Drew. The film was released to theaters on June 15, 2007, and grossed over $7 million in its opening weekend, though the film was not well received by critics. Roberts was set to reunite with Nancy Drew director Andrew Fleming on both Rodeo Gal and a Nancy Drew sequel in 2007, but these films were never made.

Roberts said in a 2007 interview: "Right now I am focusing on movies. I am getting ready to start a new movie this summer so that is taking a lot of my time. I think when I am a little bit older it is definitely something I'd like to pursue." In another interview, she said: "My musical career is indefinitely on hold. I don't like people who become like 'actor slash singer.' I think people should be one or the other because usually you're not going to be great at both. You're going to be better at one, so you might as well stick to the one you're good at. I'm going for acting." In 2008, Roberts starred as the lead in the film Wild Child, about a rebellious teen from Malibu, California, sent to a boarding school in England. Roberts described her character as "pretty much your typical spoiled-brat Malibu socialite who gets shipped off to a British boarding school." Roberts also appeared in two films: Lymelife, which was premiered at the 2008 Toronto International Film Festival, and The Flight Before Christmas, where she had her voiceover debut when she voiced the English version of the character Wilma. In 2009, Roberts starred alongside Jake T. Austin in Hotel for Dogs, based on the novel by Lois Duncan. The film premiered in January 2009, and took fifth place in its opening weekend with over $17 million. The film has to-date grossed over $114 million, and received generally mixed reviews from critics. She also appeared that year in The Winning Season, portraying Abbie Miller.

2010s: Mature roles and critical recognition 

In 2010, Roberts co-starred as Grace in the film Valentine's Day in which her aunt, Julia Roberts also appeared, although they were never together on-screen. She also appeared that year in Twelve, Memoirs of a Teenage Amnesiac, 4.3.2.1., It's Kind of a Funny Story, and Virginia. In 2011, she starred alongside Freddie Highmore in the romantic comedy The Art of Getting By. She also played the role of Jill Roberts in the Wes Craven film Scream 4. Roberts next appeared in the 2012 film Celeste and Jesse Forever, parodying pop stars such as Kesha with her performance as Riley Banks, an incurious blonde singer. Roberts said in an interview that her role as Banks tempted her to write an album of songs using her character as an alter ego. On February 7, 2013, The Hollywood Reporter confirmed that Roberts had been cast to star in a pilot for Fox called Delirium, based on the Lauren Oliver novels. She portrayed Lena Haloway, the protagonist, but Fox decided not to pick up the show. The pilot episode was picked up by Hulu and was available to stream for a limited time beginning on June 20, 2014. Roberts co-starred with John Cusack and Evan Peters in the comedy-drama film Adult World, released on April 18, 2013.

Roberts played a recent college graduate who works at a sex shop to make ends meet. She has said that most of her lines were ad-libbed so her reactions in the film were completely genuine. Her performance was praised by both Andrew O'Hehir of Salon and Stephanie Zacharek of The Village Voice, who praised Roberts' performance as "both breezy and carefully tuned". In the next month, she guest starred as Amanda Barrington in the animated sitcom Family Guy, in the episode "No Country Club for Old Men". Roberts then starred in the comedy film We're the Millers, alongside Jennifer Aniston and Jason Sudeikis. It was released on August 3, 2013. The film received mixed reviews from critics and was a financial success, grossing over $269 million against a budget of $37 million. Roberts played the lead role in Gia Coppola's directorial debut, Palo Alto, based on James Franco's short story collection of the same name. The film was released on August 29, 2013. It received generally positive reviews, with particular praise for Roberts' performance. Tom Shone of The Guardian and Ian Freer of Empire both called her the "standout" of the film, with Freer praising her performance for being "heartbreaking as she suggests longings and anxieties without over-hyping it. Much like the film itself."Robert next appeared in season three of the FX anthology horror series American Horror Story, called American Horror Story: Coven, in a main role from late 2013 through January 2014. Roberts portrayed a self-involved party girl named Madison Montgomery, who also happens to be a telekinetic witch. She then portrayed Maggie Esmerelda, a con artist posing as a fortune teller, in American Horror Story: Freak Show. In 2015, Roberts starred alongside Palo Alto co-star Nat Wolff in Ashby, portraying the supporting role of Eloise. The film had its world premiere at the Tribeca Film Festival on April 19, and was released on September 25, in a limited release and through video on demand. Roberts next appeared in the horror film The Blackcoat's Daughter (also known by its original title February) alongside Kiernan Shipka. Directed by Osgood Perkins, the film premiered at the 2015 Toronto International Film Festival. Roberts played the lead character Chanel Oberlin on Fox's comedy horror series Scream Queens, alongside Jamie Lee Curtis and Lea Michele. The series was created by American Horror Story producers Ryan Murphy and Brad Falchuk, with Glee producer Ian Brennan. The show was canceled after two seasons.

Roberts starred alongside Dave Franco in Lionsgate's adaptation of the young-adult novel Nerve. The film premiered at the SVA Theater on July 12, 2016, and grossed $85 million worldwide against its $19 million budget. In 2017, Roberts played Jess in the drama film Who We Are Now, released on September 9 at the 2017 Toronto International Film Festival. Later, Roberts returned to American Horror Story, guest starring as newscast reporter Serena Belinda, in its seventh season, Cult, in the episode "11/9". In March 2018, it was announced that Roberts was set to star in Anya's Ghost, an upcoming supernatural comedy film based on the award-winning graphic novel of the same name, written by Vera Brosgol and published in 2011. From April to August 2018, Roberts starred in three films: In a Relationship, Billionaire Boys Club, and Little Italy. She next appeared in American Horror Story: Apocalypse, where she reprised her role of Madison Montgomery for the crossover season, returning to the main cast. On October 8, 2018, it was announced that Roberts had joined the cast of the computer-animated musical comedy film UglyDolls, voicing the character Wedgehead. The film was released on May 3, 2019. In the same month, after reports about Roberts being cast as Kat Baker in the Netflix series Spinning Out, it was announced that she had exited the series due to scheduling conflicts. In 2019, Roberts starred in the fantasy drama film Paradise Hills, as Uma. The film had its world premiere at the Sundance Film Festival on January 26. From September through November 2019, Roberts starred in the ninth season of American Horror Story, subtitled 1984, portraying Brooke Thompson. The season has been described as being heavily influenced by classic horror slasher films such as Friday the 13th and Halloween.

2020s: Recent roles 
In March 2019, it was announced that she would star in the romantic comedy film Holidate, which was released on October 28, 2020. Roberts appeared in the controversial 2020 thriller film The Hunt. In September 2020, it was announced that she signed a first look television deal at Hulu. In April 2021, Roberts was cast to star alongside Thomas Mann and Lewis Tan in the romantic comedy About Fate, directed by Marius Balčiūnas-Weisberg. In October 2021, she was set to star in and produce thriller film Abandoned with John Gallagher Jr. and Michael Shannon. In 2022, she was cast to star in Madame Web, an installment of Sony's Spider-Man Universe.

Public image 
In February 2009, Roberts was named the brand ambassador for Neutrogena, appearing in print and television advertisements for the company. She has appeared multiple times as part of Teen Vogue Best Dressed list, including in June 2007, September 2008, December 2008, and February 2009.

In January 2021, Roberts paid tribute to her aunt Julia Roberts as the new ambassador of the Pretty Woman collection corresponding to the French jewelry firm Fred.

Personal life

In September 2011, Roberts began attending Sarah Lawrence College but by January 2012, she had put her studies on hold to concentrate on work commitments.

An avid reader, she launched her book club on Instagram, titled Belletrist, in March 2017.

In June 2016, the Human Rights Campaign released a video in tribute to the victims of the Orlando nightclub shooting; in the video, Roberts and others told the stories of the people killed there.

Relationships 
In 2012, Roberts began dating actor Evan Peters, whom she met on the set of the film Adult World. In July 2013, while they were staying at a hotel in Montreal, Quebec, someone overheard a dispute coming from their room and called the police. After a "heated argument", they had begun hitting each other. When the police arrived, they arrested Roberts. Peters was not arrested because Roberts did not have any immediately visible injuries. A week later, she was seen with bruises and other injuries all over her body. Peters declined to press charges, and Roberts was released several hours later. In a joint statement, the couple called it "an unfortunate incident and misunderstanding," and stated that they "are working together to move past it." Peters confirmed in March 2014 that he and Roberts were engaged. Throughout their relationship, they separated and reconciled multiple times, with their second split reportedly happening in May 2016. After reuniting later that year, they ended their relationship in March 2019.

In March 2019, Roberts began a relationship with actor Garrett Hedlund. In August 2020, it was announced that the couple were expecting their first child together. Roberts subsequently appeared as the first pregnant celebrity on the cover of Cosmopolitan magazine that December. Their son was born on December 27, 2020, in Los Angeles. In January 2022, it was announced that Roberts and Hedlund had split.

Filmography

Film

Television

Web

Producer

Discography

Soundtrack albums

Singles

Other appearances

Music videos

As lead artist

Guest appearances

Awards and nominations

References

External links

 
 
 
 

1991 births
21st-century American actresses
21st-century American singers
21st-century American women singers
Actresses from New York (state)
Actresses from the San Francisco Bay Area
American child actresses
American child singers
American women pop singers
American film actresses
American people of English descent
American people of German descent
American people of Irish descent
American people of Scottish descent
American people of Swedish descent
American people of Welsh descent
American television actresses
American voice actresses
Child pop musicians
Columbia Records artists
Living people
People from Rhinebeck, New York
Emma
Sarah Lawrence College alumni
Singers from New York (state)